Gene Roberts may refer to:

 Gene Roberts (journalist) (born 1932), American editor and professor of journalism
 Gene Roberts (American football) (1923–2009), American football running back
 Meg Randall (born 1926), American actress, credited as Gene Roberts before 1949
 Gene Roberts, former mayor of Chattanooga, Tennessee

See also
Eugene Roberts (disambiguation)
 Jean Roberts (born 1943), Australian athlete in the shot put and discus